Innocenzio Taccone was an Italian painter of the Baroque.

Taccone was born in Bologna. He was a pupil and relative of Annibale Carracci. In 1600, he accompanied that artist to Rome, where he assisted him in many of his works. In the vault of the church of Santa Maria del Popolo, he painted three large frescoes, from the designs of Annibale, representing the Coronation of the Virgin, Christ appearing to St. Peter, and Assumption of St. Paul. He also painted scenes from the Life of St. Andrew Apostle for a chapel in S. Angelo in Pescheria. Taccone died in Rome, in the prime of life, in the pontificate of Urban VIII (1623–1644).

References

17th-century Italian painters
Italian male painters
Painters from Bologna
Italian Baroque painters
Year of death unknown
Year of birth unknown